Margie  is an American television sitcom starring Cynthia Pepper that was broadcast on ABC from October 12, 1961 to August 31, 1962.

Premise 
Margie was set in the Roaring Twenties. Margie Clayton lived with her parents, a little brother, and an aunt. Maybelle Jackson (her best friend) was a flapper. Two boys, Heywood Batts and Johnny Green, vied for Margie's affection. The locale was Madison, a small town "somewhere in New England".

The series was adapted from the 1946 film of the same name starring Jeanne Crain. Larry Klein, one of the producers, said, "We have preferred to create our own family and situations rather than rely on fixed characters created by someone else." Among the differences, the film had Margie living with her grandmother because her mother had died when the title character was a little girl.

Cast
Cynthia Pepper as Margie Clayton
Dave Willock as Harvey Clayton
Wesley Tackitt as Nora Clayton
Tommy Ivo as Haywood Botts
Penney Parker as Maybelle Jackson
Richard Gering as Johnny Green
Hollis Irving as Aunt Phoebe
Johnny Bangert as Cornell Clayton

Production
20th Century Fox Television produced Margie'''s 26 episodes. They were in black-and-white, and they included a laugh track. Crest toothpaste, Prell shampoo, and Ralston-Purina were among the sponsors.

William Self was the executive producer. Harry Goodman and Klein were the producers. Among the directors were Rod Amateau, Jack Donohue,  Gene Reynolds, Don Richardson, James Sheldon, and Jack Sher.

The theme song was the 1920-vintage Margie, by Con Conrad, Benny Davis, and J. Russel Robinson.

 Publications 
Dell Publishing produced two issues of Margie'' comic books based on the TV series.

Episodes

See also 
 1961-62 United States network television schedule

References

External links 
 

1960s American sitcoms
1961 American television series debuts
1962 American television series endings
American Broadcasting Company original programming
Black-and-white American television shows
Live action television shows based on films
Television series about families
Television series about teenagers
Television series by 20th Century Fox Television
Television series set in the 1920s
Period television series
Flappers
Television shows set in New England